OSS or Oss may refer to:

Places
 Oss, a city and municipality in the Netherlands
 Osh Airport, IATA code OSS

People with the name
 Oss (surname), a surname

Arts and entertainment
 O.S.S. (film), a 1946 World War II spy film about Office of Strategic Services agents
 O.S.S. (TV series), a British spy series which aired in 1957 in the UK and the US
 Open Source Shakespeare, a non-commercial website with texts and statistics on Shakespeare's plays
 Old Syriac Sinaiticus, a Bible manuscript
 Organization of Super Spies, a fictional organization in the Spy Kids franchise

Education
 ÖSS (Öğrenci Seçme Sınavı), a former university entrance exam in Turkey
 Options Secondary School, Chula Vista, California
 Otto Stern School for Integrated Doctoral Education, Frankfurt am Main, Germany
 Outram Secondary School, Singapore

Organizations
 Observatoire du Sahara et du Sahel, dedicated to fighting desertification and drought; based in Tunis, Tunisia
 Office for Science and Society, Science Education from Montreal's McGill University
 Office of Strategic Services, World War II forerunner of the Central Intelligence Agency
 Office of the Supervising Scientist, an Australian Government body under the Supervising Scientist
 Offshore Super Series, an offshore powerboat racing organization
 Open Spaces Society, a UK registered charity championing public paths and open spaces
 Operations Support Squadron, a United States Air Force support squadron
 Optimized Systems Software, a former software company

Science and technology
 Ohio Sky Survey
 Optical SteadyShot, a lens-based image stabilization system by Sony
 Optimal Stereo Sound, another name for the Jecklin Disk recording technique
 Oriented spindle stop, a type of spindle motion used within some G-code cycles
 Ovary Sparing Spay (OSS)
 Overspeed Sensor System (OSS), part of the Train Protection & Warning System for railroad trains

Computer software and hardware
 OpenSearchServer, search engine software
 Open Sound System, a standard interface for making and capturing sound in Unix operating systems
 Open-source software, software with its source code made freely available
 Operations support systems, computers used by telecommunications service providers to administer and maintain network systems

Other uses 
 OSS Fighters, a Romania-based kickboxing promotion
 Order of St. Sava, a Serbian decoration
 Ossetic language code

See also 
 AAS (disambiguation)
 Hoz (disambiguation)
 OS (disambiguation)